Cognat is a surname. Notable people with the surname include:

André Cognat (1938–2021), France-born French Guiana tribal chief
Edgard Cognat (1919–1994), Brazilian painter and sculptor
Timothé Cognat (born 1998), French footballer

See also
Cognet (disambiguation)